Tibersyrnola bacillum is a species of sea snail, a marine gastropod mollusk in the family Pyramidellidae, the pyrams and their allies.

Description
The length of the shell varies between 5.5 mm and 12 mm.
The slender shell has a rod-like shape. It has a particular type of coloration. It is marbled reddish-brown and white, with a narrow band of alternate brown and white spots revolving midway between sutures and on the middle of the upper surface of the body whorl, which has a white peripheral belt. This coloring is 
sometimes very faint. The whorl of the protoconch stands obliquely on edge, the very short spire inclined downward. The 12½ or 13  subsequent whorls of the teleoconch are flat, and separated by deeply cut sutures. They are sculptured with faint growth lines and an impressed line revolving below the suture. Some very faint spirals show elsewhere in certain lights. The periphery is rounded. The base of the shell is convex and subperforate. The aperture is small and narrowly ovate. The columella bears a single strong fold.

Distribution
This marine species occurs in the Pacific Ocean off Japan and the Philippines.

References

 Higo, S., Callomon, P. & Goto, Y. (1999). Catalogue and bibliography of the marine shell-bearing Mollusca of Japan. Osaka. : Elle Scientific Publications. 749 pp
 Okutani T., ed. (2000) Marine mollusks in Japan. Tokai University Press. 1173 pp.
page(s): 707

External links
 To World Register of Marine Species
 

Pyramidellidae
Gastropods described in 1901